The 1963 Montana State Bobcats football team was an American football team that represented Montana State College (now known as Montana State University) in the Big Sky Conference during the 1963 NCAA College Division football season. In its first season under head coach Jim Sweeney, the team compiled a 6–3 record and finished second out of four teams in the Big Sky Conference.

Schedule

References

Montana State
Montana State Bobcats football seasons
Montana State Bobcats football